Song Won-jae (born 21 February 1989) is a South Korean footballer who plays as defender for Bucheon FC in K League Challenge.

Career
Song was selected by Ulsan Hyundai in the 2011 K League draft but he didn't have a debut match in his first club. He moved to Ulsan Hyundai Mipo in middle of 2011.

He returned to professional league with signing with Bucheon FC.

Song joined Sangju Sangmu in 2013 to start his military duty.

References

External links 

1989 births
Living people
Association football defenders
South Korean footballers
Ulsan Hyundai FC players
Ulsan Hyundai Mipo Dockyard FC players
Bucheon FC 1995 players
Gimcheon Sangmu FC players
K League 1 players
Korea National League players
K League 2 players
Korea University alumni